Carrosio is a comune (municipality) in the Province of Alessandria in the Italian region Piedmont, located about  southeast of Turin and about  southeast of Alessandria.

Carrosio borders the following municipalities: Gavi and Voltaggio.

Demographic evolution

References

Cities and towns in Piedmont